This page list topics related to Åland.



0-9

A
Åland crisis
Åland State Provincial Office
Åland Swedish
Archipelago Sea

B
Baltic Sea

C

D

E

F
Fasta Åland

G
Geography of Åland
Government of Åland
Gulf of Bothnia
Geta, Åland

H
History of Åland

I
International Island Games Association

J

K

L

M
Mariehamn
Märket
Municipalities of Åland

N
Nordic Council

O

P
Parliament of Åland
Politics of Åland

Q

R

S
Sea of Åland
Small European Postal Administration Cooperation
Sweden

T
Treaty of Fredrikshamn

U

V

W

X

Y

Z

See also
Lists of country-related topics - similar lists for other countries

Aland